Siddons or Siddon is a surname. Notable people with the surname include:

 Anne Rivers Siddons (1936-2019), American novelist
 Bill Siddons, manager of the band The Doors (1968–1972)
 Harold Siddons (born 1922), Northern Irish actor
 Frederick Lincoln Siddons (1864–1931), U.S. federal judge
 Jamie Siddons (born 1964), Australian cricketer
 John Siddons (born 1927), retired Australian politician
 Michael Siddons (born 1928), Wales Herald of Arms Extraordinary
 Michael John Siddons-Corby (born 1951), English guitarist
 Royston Siddons (1899–1976), Australian industrialist
 Sarah Siddons (1775–1831), British actress
 Dame Sarah Elizabeth Siddons Mair (1846–1941), Scottish suffragette campaigner
 Tom Siddon (born 1941), former Canadian politician
 William Siddons (1864–1893), English footballer

See also 

 Sarah Siddons Award, an annual award given by the Sarah Siddons Society in Chicago for outstanding performance in Chicago theater production
 Siddons Patera, a volcanic caldera on Venus
 Siddons Point, Livingston Island, South Shetland Islands, Antarctica
 "To Mrs Siddons", a sonnet written by Samuel Taylor Coleridge